The Greensboro Cobras is a member of the Tobacco Road Basketball League based in Greensboro, North Carolina that began play in 2013. Home games are played at the Ida H. Goode gymnasium on the campus of  Bennett College.

References

External links
Greensboro Cobras official website

Basketball teams in North Carolina
Basketball in Greensboro, North Carolina
Basketball teams established in 2013
2013 establishments in North Carolina